The Abergwaun Stakes is a Listed flat horse race in Ireland open to thoroughbreds aged three years or older. It is run at Tipperary over a distance of 5 furlongs (1,006 metres), and it is scheduled to take place each year in August.

The race was first run in 2003.

Records
Most successful horse (3 Wins):
 Senor Benny - (2004,2007,2008)

Leading jockey (3 wins):
 Declan McDonogh -  Senor Benny (2004,2008), Gorane
 Adrian Nicholls – Peace Offering (2006), Inxile (2011,2012) 

Leading trainer (3 wins):
 Kevin McDonagh – Senor Benny (2004,2007,2008)
 David Nicholls - Peace Offering (2006), Inxile (2011,2012)

Winners

See also
 Horse racing in Ireland
 List of Irish flat horse races

References
Racing Post:

Flat races in Ireland
Tipperary Racecourse
Open sprint category horse races
Recurring sporting events established in 2003
2003 establishments in Ireland